Estiffanulga is an unincorporated community in Liberty County, Florida, United States.

Glenn E. Summers (1925-2020), judge, lawyer, and politician, lived in Estiffanulga.

References

Unincorporated communities in Liberty County, Florida
Unincorporated communities in Florida